The Fashionable Lover is a comedy play by the British writer Richard Cumberland. It was first staged at the Drury Lane Theatre in London in January 1772. A sentimental comedy, it follows the adventures of Augusta Aubrey after she leaves her ward's house and is nearly seduced by the villainous Lord Abberville.

References

External links

 The Fashionable Lover; A Comedy: As Acted at the Theatre-Royal in Drury-Lane. Belfast, 1772

Bibliography
 Nicoll, Allardyce. A History of English Drama 1660-1900. Volume III: Late Eighteenth Century Drama. Cambridge University Press, 1952.

Plays by Richard Cumberland
1772 plays
West End plays
Comedy plays